Magnolia Pictures is an American film distributor and production company, and is a subsidiary of Mark Cuban and Todd Wagner's 2929 Entertainment.

Magnolia was formed in 2001 by Bill Banowsky and Eamonn Bowles, and specializes in both foreign and independent films. Magnolia distributes some of its films, especially foreign and genre titles, under the Magnet Releasing arm. In April 2011, Cuban had placed Magnolia up for sale, but stated that he would not sell the company unless the offer was "very, very compelling." One of the recent releases Magnolia distributed is Shoplifters, a Japanese drama that won the 2018 Palme d'Or at the Cannes Film Festival and was nominated for Best Foreign Language Film at the 91st Academy Awards.

2000s

2010s

2020s

Future releases

References

External links

Magnet Releasing

Film distributors of the United States
2929 Entertainment holdings
Mass media companies established in 2001
2001 establishments in New York City
Mass media companies based in New York City
Film production companies of the United States
International sales agents